Cut The Cake (foaled 26 October 2000) is a Thoroughbred racehorse who won the New Zealand Derby in 2003.

Coming into the Derby as a winner of only a maiden at Matamata, the gelding was not among the favourites for the Group 1 race. But after being given a beautiful rails ride by Michael Coleman, he simply outstayed his rivals and won by a long head with favourite Mount Street in second place.

The win gave Paul Moroney, who has bought countless Group 1 winners at sales all around the world, the first Group 1 winner he has actually bred.

Cut The Cake was expected to go on and become a leading stayer after his Derby win, but he has been disappointing in only winning two races since, one of which was over hurdles. He ran his last race in 2006.

References

 Cut The Cake's pedigree

2000 racehorse births
Racehorses bred in New Zealand
Racehorses trained in New Zealand
Thoroughbred family C4